William Holmes (born 14 January 1936), known as Bill Holmes or Billy Holmes, is a former British cyclist.

Cycling career
He competed at the 1956 Summer Olympics and the 1960 Summer Olympics. He won a silver medal at the 1956 Olympics in the team road race event.

He represented England in the road race at the 1958 British Empire and Commonwealth Games in Cardiff, Wales.

References

External links
 

1936 births
Living people
British male cyclists
Olympic cyclists of Great Britain
Cyclists at the 1956 Summer Olympics
Cyclists at the 1960 Summer Olympics
Sportspeople from Kingston upon Hull
Olympic silver medallists for Great Britain
Olympic medalists in cycling
Medalists at the 1956 Summer Olympics
Cyclists at the 1958 British Empire and Commonwealth Games
Commonwealth Games competitors for England